The alleged "Will of Fernando Malang Balagtas", sometimes also referred to as the "Will of Pansomun" is a disputed early Spanish-era Philippine document which was supposedly issued "on 25 March 1539" by a "Don Fernando Malang Balagtas", whose original name (before his baptism as a Catholic) was "Pansomun."  Despite its provenance having been questioned by Isabelo de Los Reyes when he first published a copy of the will in the first volume of his seminal compilation "El Folklore Filipino", and more recently by Philippine scholars such as William Henry Scott, this "Will of Pansomun" is still popularly used as a reference for tracing the genealogies of the Rajahs and Lakans who ruled the pre-colonial polities of Maynila and Tondo in the 1570s.

It is sometimes mistakenly dated "25 March 1589" instead of "1539" but this does not reflect the date originally cited by de Los Reyes, and is inconsistent with the document's use as an attachment to yet another will - that of Andres Mangaya, who claimed to be Malang Balagtas' descendant when he executed his own will on "Oct 3 1563."

Disputed Provenance

Genuineness questioned by Isabelo de Los Reyes 
The document referred to as the "Will of Pansomun" first became known through the work of Isabelo de Los Reyes, in Volume 2 of his seminal work in Philippine folkloristics, "El Folklore Filipino." This second volume, published in 1890, included the work in a category titled "Folkloristic miscellany", and, along with the 1563 will of Andres Mangaya, who claimed to be Malang Balagtas' descendant and who had attached the original "Will of Pansomun" to his own will.

De los Reyes immediately questioned the provenance of these two "very curious unpublished documents about the Rulers of the Philippines and Moluccas at the time of the Conquest," noting that they had: "certain facts which contradict those which are accepted as historic truths"

Exposition on inconsistencies by William Henry Scott
Commenting on the will in his 1982 book "Cracks in the Parchment Curtain," William Henry Scott notes that two "anachronistic" dates in the documents immediately bing its genuineness to question: the "25 March 1539" date of the document itself, and the "early part of 1524" reference in the text when Malang Balagtas and his family were supposedly baptized by a bishop in Cebu.  Both of these dates are impossible, since, as Scott points out: "the only Spaniards in the Philippines in 1524 or 1539 were captive survivors of Magellan's fleet, and none of them were either priests or bishops."

Scott notes that these dates could not simply be errors of  Malang Balagtas when he executed the will, because the Certificate of Death, an official Spanish document, was attached to the document and bore the same dates. Scott notes that these historical inconsistencies:
"... may be simple mistakes on the part of a senile illiterate on his deathbead, but similar details in an official death certificate appended to the will cannot be dismissed so lightly."

Furthermore, Scott notes that the death certificate was supposedly sworn by a church official who never existed historically:"The death certificate purports to have been sworn, in the first-person singular, by Augustinian Procurator Fray Juan de Jesus in the Mission of San Carlos on March 21 of the year "mil quinientos treinta y nueve." Aside from the curious date and the even more curious circumstance of the testator's death having preceded the execution of the will by four days, both Isabelo (de Los Reyes) and the othrs who examined the documents were aware that there had been no Augustinian Friar by the name of Juan de Jesus in the Philippines in the 16th century, nor had there been any mission or town of San Carlos at that time.  As a topnothcer in graduate courses in paleography, and the theory and practice of editing public documents, Isabelo wisely refrained from attributing authenticity to either document."

25 March 1539 v. 25 March 1589 
The occasional reference to the Will of Pansomun can be traced to the September 1919 issue of Philippine Historical Quarterly, which published a copy of the will with the date "25 March 1589" instead of 1539.  A large part of this text was recently requoted by historian Luis Camara Dery in his 2001 book "A History of the Inarticulate." Despite the somewhat more palatable 1589 date, this 1919 printing of the will still contains the anachronistic 1524 date of the baptism.

Purported Content 
The will claims to document seven generations of the family of Fernando Malang Balagtas, whose name before his baptism into Catholicism had been "Pansomun." It places Malang Balagtas in the 5th generation of that family tree, which means that the will purportedly documents two generations of relatives younger than him, and four generations of relatives older than him.

The first two generations of the family tree includes various legendary names from the folklore of the polities in Maynila, Tondo, Namayan, and Pasig while the third and fourth generations supposedly link Malang Balagtas to the ruling houses of Maynila, Tondo: "namely Lacandola and the two rulers, Ladiamora" - first degree cousins once removed. (The document does not mention Rajah Matanda and Rajah Sulayman by name, so Dery notes is uncertain whether this refers to Matanda and Sulayman themselves. "Ladiamora," meaning "young rajah (rajah mora or raja muda)", is generally acknowledged as a descriptive phrase and could refer to either a descendant or ancestor of Matanda and Sulayman.)

The last generations of the family tree supposedly identify the individuals who should be included in the property inheritances due to the descendants of these "great houses."

Historical documents with similar content 
Although the provenance of the Will of Fernando Malang Balagtas is in question, there are a number of other historical documents containing similar information about the genealogies of the royal houses of Maynila and Tondo.  These include the notarized Spanish era wills held by the Philippine National Archives, collectively known as the "Lakandula Documents" because they are mostly documents executed by direct descendants of Rajah Lakandula (Bunao); and other miscellaneous genealogies, such as another genealogy printed in Volume 2 of El Folklore Filipino, which both De los Reyes and Scott consider more authoritative than the supposed Will of Pansonum.

References 

Disputed Philippine historical documents
Balagtas, Fernando Malang